The Simple Past (Le passé simple) is a novel written by Driss Chraïbi.

1954 French novels